Edwin Sandys (1519 – 10 July 1588) was an English prelate.
He was Anglican Bishop of Worcester (1559–1570), London (1570–1576) and Archbishop of York (1576–1588) during the reign of Elizabeth I of England. He was one of the translators of the Bishops' Bible.

Early years and education
Edwin was born in 1519 at Esthwaite Hall, which is 1 mile south of Hawkshead, Cumbria, on the road to Newby Bridge. The Hall nestles in the valley and overlooks Esthwaite Water. Today it is still a family home, although the Sandys family now reside in the grander Graythwaite Hall, a few miles further south. He was the son of William Sandys and Margaret Dixon.

Whilst there is a theory that young Edwin received his early education at Furness Abbey, it is believed by Collinson that both Edmund Grindal and Edwin Sandys shared a childhood, quite probably in St Bees, and were educated together. A branch of the Sandys family lived at Rottington Hall near St Bees. The heralds in 1563 knew the family as"...of St Bees in the County of Cumberland", and Sandys himself recalled that he and Grindal had lived "familiarly" and "as brothers" and were only separated between Sandys's 13th and 18th Years. The St Bees registers are full of Sandys, and it thought likely that Sandys grew up at Rottington. However, his place of education is not recorded, though it is known that the Marian martyr John Bland was the schoolmaster of Sandys. Edwin Sandys kept one step behind Edmund Grindal in his subsequent career, succeeding him as bishop of London, and then archbishop of York.

He went up to St John's College, Cambridge, graduating BA in 1539 and then a Doctor of Divinity ten years later. In 1547 he was elected master of Catharine Hall and by the death of Edward VI in 1553 he was Vice Chancellor of the university.

Exile
On the death of King Edward, the Duke of Northumberland sought to avoid a Roman Catholic monarchy by placing Lady Jane Grey on the throne. He and his followers arrived in Cambridge to raise an army in East Anglia and demanded that Edwin Sandys preach a sermon. When the rebellion failed and Mary Tudor took the throne, Edwin was arrested and taken to the Tower of London. For this he is mentioned in Foxe's Book of Martyrs. Later he was moved to more comfortable conditions in Marshalsea prison where he made friends with the prison keeper who connived at his escape.

He went first to Antwerp and then Augsburg and Strasbourg where his wife joined him. His wife and infant son died there of a plague. He then lived in Zurich until the accession of Elizabeth I made it safe for him to return to England; on the day of Elizabeth's coronation. On 19 February 1559 he married Cicely Wilford, sister of James Wilford.

Archbishop of York
On his return he became successively Bishop of Worcester, Bishop of London and Archbishop of York. He helped in the translation of a new version of the Bishops' Bible. Sandys's own personal copy may be seen in the Hawkshead Grammar School Museum in Cumbria.

Along with other Marian exiles, who returned to positions of wealth and importance, Archbishop Sandys was concerned that true religion and sound learning would forever flourish in the land. They saw the necessity of education for religion's sake and the need for the Church of England to hold their own in discussion with Roman Catholics. To these ends Edwin Sandys founded Hawkshead Grammar School in 1585 and endowed it with sufficient land and property for it to offer a free education.

Sandys died on 10 July 1588, and was buried in Southwell Minster in Nottinghamshire.

Family

Sandys was twice married. His first wife, Mary Sandys, died in 1558 at Strasbourg. They had one son:
 James Sandys (died 1557, Strasbourg)

On 19 February 1559, Sandys married Cicely Wilford, daughter of Thomas Wilford and sister of James Wilford. They had the following children:
 Sir Samuel Sandys  (1560–1623)
 Sir Edwin Sandys  (1561–1629), Treasurer of the Virginia Company of London
 Sir Miles Sandys  (1563–1645)
 William Sandys (born 1565), died young
 Margaret Sandys (1566–1611), married Anthony Aucher
 Thomas Sandys (1568–), colonist, a first settler of Jamestown, Virginia
 Anne Sandys (1570–), married Sir William Barne
 Henry Sandys (1572–1626)
 George Sandys (1578–1644), traveller and poet, colonist in Virginia

In 1604 Cicely Sandys enlisted the support of Anne of Denmark in an unsuccessful attempt to found a university at Ripon in Yorkshire.

References

1519 births
1588 deaths
Bishops of London
Bishops of Worcester
Archbishops of York
16th-century Church of England bishops
Alumni of St John's College, Cambridge
Doctors of Divinity
Masters of St Catharine's College, Cambridge
Vice-Chancellors of the University of Cambridge
Marian exiles
16th-century translators
People from St Bees
People from Hawkshead
16th-century Anglican theologians